Kurentovanje 2023 is the upcoming 63rd Ptuj carnival, organized by Ptuj Tourism Public Institute.

After two years of the pandemic and virtual events and self-initiated and spontaneously organized processions and parades around the old city center, the carnival is back in full range, without restrictions and officially organized. This year's novelty is the opening of Kurent's house in the old town.

Schedule 
Every night between 12 and 20 February, Kurents (Korants) will perform at 6 pm local.

Introduction

Main traditional events

Accompanying events

Evening display of indigenous characters

Music entertainment 
From 3–19 February 2023, various music acts will perform at Kampus Hall, a commercial part completely separated from the carnival.

Indigenous characters 
Indigenous characters (masks) from Ptuj wider area including Ptuj field, Drava field and from Haloze:

 "Kurent" or "Korant" (the main character)
 "The Whip Crackers" (for happines and well-being)
 "Carnival dancers" (from Pobrežje, Videm)
 "the Spearman" (marital character)
 "Ploughmen" (draw a magic circle)
 "Log-Haulers" (to enchant fertility)
 "The Devil" (fear, fear, is coming)
 "The Trough" (the straw bride)

 "Old Woman Carrying Her Man" (spirits of heaven)
 "The Mischievous Bear" (from Ptuj field)
 "Kurike and Piceki" (for a good harvest)
 "Jürek and Rabolj" (from Haloze)
 "Fairies" (Zabovci)
 "Rusas" (from Ptuj field)
 "Gypsis" (from Dornava)

Prince of the carnival 
Knight Hinko Sodinski, noble Gall, will take over the keys of the city hall from the mayor at the carnival opening (11.2.) to "rule" the town for 11 days.

Newǃ Kurent's House 
On 3 February 2023, Kurent's House was opened by "Association of Kurent clubs" at Murko Street in the old town center, right across the prominent Ptuj Town Theater. This house represent the importance of Kurent (Korant) at his well deserved and recognized spot in the history. It is the result of the efforts of 25 different Kurent associations (with total 1,100 members) to keep the tradition and cermenonies of Kurent (Korant) to live on.

References

External links 
 Kurentovanje Official

Slovenian folklore
Cultural heritage of Slovenia
Slavic carnival
Intangible Cultural Heritage of Humanity
2023 in Slovenia

sl:63. Kurentovanje (2023)